The 1908 West Derbyshire by-election was held on 15 April 1908.  The by-election was held due to the succession to the peerage of the incumbent Liberal Unionist MP, Victor Cavendish, who became the ninth Duke of Devonshire.  It was retained by the unopposed Liberal Unionist candidate Henry Petty-Fitzmaurice.

References

West Derbyshire by-election
West Derbyshire by-election
1900s in Derbyshire
West Derbyshire by-election
By-elections to the Parliament of the United Kingdom in Derbyshire constituencies
Unopposed by-elections to the Parliament of the United Kingdom (need citation)